Dick Martin may refer to:
Dick Martin (comedian) (1922–2008), co-host of Rowan & Martin's Laugh-In
Dick Martin (artist) (1927–1990), American illustrator, particularly associated with the Land of Oz

See also
Dickie Martin (disambiguation)
Richard Martin (disambiguation)